Ruqaya Al-Ghasra (born September 6, 1982), is a Bahraini athlete. She was one of the first women to represent Bahrain at the Olympic Games, by taking part in the women's 100 metres sprint at the 2004 Summer Olympics in Athens. (Bahraini women had, however, taken part in the Paralympics as early as 1984.)

She won medals at the 2006 Asian Games and went on to run at the 2008 Beijing Olympics and the 2009 World Championships in Athletics. She announced her international retirement in 2009. It was revealed in July 2010 that Al-Ghasra had failed an out of competition doping test and she was banned from competing for two years (between 17 September 2009 and 16 September 2011).

Career

2004 Olympic debut
ESPN stated that Al-Ghasra "overcame the objections of fundamentalists in her village" to participate. She ran with a head scarf and her body fully covered. She finished fifth in her heat, with a time of 11.49 seconds, and did not advance. A time of 11.43 seconds would have enabled her to qualify for the following round. By 2006, she had improved her time to 11.34 seconds.

In 2003, Al-Ghasra had won gold in the 100 metre and 200 metre races at the Arabian Championships in Lebanon.

In 2004, prior to the Olympics, she won three silver medals, in the 60 metre, 200 metre and 400 metre races, at the Asian Indoor Championships in Iran. She also represented Bahrain in the 400 metre event at the World Indoor Championships in Budapest.

Regional medals
In 2006, Al-Ghasra won the gold medal in the 200 metre race at the Asian Games, in Doha. This made her the first Bahraini-born athlete to win gold at a major international athletics competition extending beyond the Arab world. She also won bronze in the 100 metre race. In 2007, she was scheduled to take part in the Pan Arab Games in Egypt, the Asian Championships in Lebanon and the IAAF World Championships in Osaka. She pulled out of the latter championships due to injury.

In 2008, Al-Ghasra won gold in the 60 metre race at the Asian Indoor Championships in Doha, setting a new championships record with a time of 7.40 seconds.

2008 Olympics and 2009 World Championships
She qualified to compete in the 100 metre and 200 metre events at the 2008 Summer Olympics in Beijing, but only competed in the 200 metre race where she reached the semi-finals. She was her country's flagbearer at the Games' opening ceremony.

At the 2009 World Championships in Athletics in Berlin, she reached the quarter-finals of the 100 m, and the semi-finals of the 200 m, recording season's bests of 11.49 and 23.26 seconds respectively. At the end of the year, she announced her retirement from international athletics at the age of 27, to much surprise. She said that she came to the decision following consultation with doctors and specialists, who advised to take a long period off in order to undergo treatment and improve her general health. However, it was revealed in July 2010 that Al-Ghasra had failed an out of competition doping test and she was banned from competing for two years (between 17 September 2009 and 16 September 2011).

See also
List of doping cases in athletics

References

External links

 "Nike swoosh raises debate", ESPN (about al-Gassra's "corporate-branded hijab")

1982 births
Living people
Bahraini female sprinters
Olympic athletes of Bahrain
Athletes (track and field) at the 2004 Summer Olympics
Athletes (track and field) at the 2008 Summer Olympics
Asian Games gold medalists for Bahrain
Asian Games bronze medalists for Bahrain
Asian Games medalists in athletics (track and field)
Athletes (track and field) at the 2006 Asian Games
Doping cases in athletics
Bahraini sportspeople in doping cases
Medalists at the 2006 Asian Games